in sanskrit according to legend, are the carpenters descended from Maya son of Vishwakarma.

Sutradhar, also known as Sutar or Suthar is a Hindu caste within the  Vishwakarma community of India. Their traditional occupation is carpentry. The great majority of Hindu sutradhars belong to the Vaishnava sect. Vishwakarma is regarded as their patron deity.

Origin 

The word Sutradhar literally means thread-holder. Sutra in sanskrit means thread (which is used to mark the course of a saw), and dhara means to hold.  The names Sutar and Suthar are abbreviated versions of Sutrahadar. 

Sutradhars, according to legend, are the carpenters descended from Maya, son of Vishwakarma. From the Rigveda, Vishwakarma is the divine engineer of the universe. In the Skanda Purana he had five children — Manu, Maya, Tvastar, Shilpi and Visvajna — and these are believed by the Vishwakarma community to have been the forebears of their five sub-groups, being respectively the gotras (clans) of blacksmiths, carpenters, bell metalworkers (metal casters), stonemasons and goldsmiths.  Together, these sons are known as Rathakar, or builders of Chariots.

There is evidence that Sutradhars were performing other tasks besides carpentry in ancient times.  A stanza from Chandimangal notes them puffing and frying rice, as well as painting. Agricultural tasks were historically done by castes of Austric origins, so the stanza may refer to a period of transition as the Sutradhar caste was forming and still performing other tasks. They were also engaged in making monuments, temples, palaces,  chariots and sculpting rock structures. They are believed to have built the Konark Sun Temple, Jagannath Temples, and the terracotta temples of Bengal.

Demography
While some Sutradhars practice Shaktism, the vast majority are members of the Vaishnava sect. They worship Vishwakarma and offer sacrifices to him on Vishwakarma Day and Vasant Panchami.

The Sutradhar caste is subdivided into a number of subcastes including Bardhamenya, Mandaranya, Khadipeda, Astakul, and Airy. The Bardhamenya, Mandaranya, and Astakul are best known as carpenters but are also known as painters, clay image makers, stone carvers as well as constructors of buildings and temples. The Khadipeda were essentially architects, known as designers of temples, palaces, mosques, and building.

Sutradhars are also subdivided into various clans, or gotras. All these clans are totemic. Common Sutradhar surnames include Dutta, Chanda, De, Pal, Sil, Kundu, Mena, Manna, Maharana, Rana, Bandra, Rakhsit, Sutradhar, Sutar, Bhandari, Fouzdar, Das, Kar, and Sharma. Fouzdar would appear to have a royal origin, while Sharma is also a surname of them.

Notes

References

Indian castes
Carpenter castes
Social groups of India
Indian surnames
Hindu communities
Social groups of Rajasthan